The 1991 Japanese Formula 3000 Championship was scheduled over 11 rounds and contested over 10 rounds. 27 different teams, 47 different drivers, 5 different chassis and 3 different engines competed.

Calendar

All events took place at venues located within the country of Japan.

Note:

Race 10 was started with the qualification times set for the race scheduled on September, 8.

The weekend in Fuji with the race cancelled on October, 27 saw only practice and qualification sections.

Final point standings

Driver

For every race, points were awarded: 9 points to the winner, 6 to the runner up, 4 to third place, 3 to fourth place, 2 to fifth place, and 1 to sixth place. No additional points were awarded. The best 7 results count. No driver had a point deduction.

Complete Overview

R=retired NS=did not start NQ=did not qualify DIS=disqualified

Formula 3000
Super Formula